Tingsryds AIF (sometimes abbreviated TAIF) is an ice hockey club based in Tingsryd, Sweden. The club is playing in HockeyAllsvenskan, the second tier of ice hockey in Sweden. The club was founded in 1923 and played seven seasons in Division I when it was Sweden's highest-level hockey league.  

Tingsryd plays their home matches at Nelson Garden Arena (formerly known as Dackehallen), which has a capacity of 3,400 spectators.

Recent seasons

External links 
Official home page
Profile on Eliteprospects.com

Ice hockey teams in Sweden
Ice hockey clubs established in 1921
Ice hockey teams in Kronoberg County
HockeyAllsvenskan teams